Marc Texier (30 March 1887 – 7 August 1915) was a French cyclist. He competed in the tandem event at the 1908 Summer Olympics.

References

External links
 

1887 births
1915 deaths
French male cyclists
Olympic cyclists of France
Cyclists at the 1908 Summer Olympics
Place of birth missing